Wertheim is a brand of domestic vacuum cleaners and floor care products.

The Wertheim brand name is now sold in Australia and New Zealand through Godfreys.

History 
The Wertheim brand was established in Australia in the 1870s when German Hugo Wertheim (1854 - 1919) moved to Melbourne and established a business as agent for his father's cousin Joseph Wertheim, a well-established manufacturer of sewing machines back in Germany. Hugo Wertheim sold sewing machines, bicycles, pianos and other mechanical devices, under brands such as Wertheim, Electra, Planet, Griffin and Hapsburg.

In 1908 Wertheim diversified into manufacturing and opened a large piano factory at Richmond, Melbourne.

The brand achieved considerable success selling sewing machines, pianos and other electrical goods constructed of mainly Australian materials.

The Australian Wertheim factory was closed in 1935 and was later turned into a Heinz factory and later re-purposed as a television studio for GTV Channel 9. Shortly after, the brand was acquired by Australian retail company Godfreys.

See also

 Wertheim Piano
 List of vacuum cleaners

References

External links
 Official Website
 Commercial Cleaning
 http://www.godfreys.com.au/product_search.php?qry=wertheim
 http://www.wertheim.uk.com

Vacuum cleaners
Australian brands